The 2020–21 Charlotte 49ers men's basketball team represented the University of North Carolina at Charlotte during the 2020–21 NCAA Division I men's basketball season. The team was led by third-year head coach Ron Sanchez, and played their home games at Dale F. Halton Arena in Charlotte, North Carolina as members of Conference USA.

Previous season
The 49ers finished the 2018–19 season 16–13, 10–8 in C-USA play to finish in fourth place. They were set to be the No. 4 seed in the C-USA tournament. However, they C-USA Tournament was canceled amid the COVID-19 pandemic.

Roster

Schedule and results

|-
!colspan=12 style=| Regular season

|-
!colspan=9 style=| Conference USA tournament

Source

Notes

References

Charlotte 49ers men's basketball seasons
Charlotte 49ers
Charlotte 49ers men's basketball
Charlotte 49ers men's basketball